Coleophora involucrella is a moth of the family Coleophoridae. It is found on the Canary Islands (Fuerteventura, La Gomera) and in Spain, Portugal, France, and Morocco.

The larvae feed on the seedheads of Santolina rosmarinifolia and Santolina chamaecyparissus.

References

involucrella
Moths described in 1905
Moths of Europe
Moths of Africa